Mark P. Brown (born c. 1956, Columbus, Ohio) is a veteran of the Ohio National Guard, a former construction/civil engineering technician and former political candidate of the Democratic party.  He was the party's 2002 and 2004 nominee to challenge incumbent Republican U.S. Representative Deborah Pryce.  Pryce won both elections gaining 108,193 votes to Brown's 54,286 in 2002, and 189,024 votes to Brown's 117,324 in 2004.

2004 Democratic party primary election results:

See also:
 Election Results, U.S. Representative from Ohio, 15th District

Living people
1950s births
Ohio Democrats
Engineers from Ohio
Politicians from Columbus, Ohio